Calitri ( or ;) is a town and comune  in the province of Avellino, Campania, Italy.

Overview 
Calitri is in Campania near the borders of the regions of Apulia and Basilicata. The Antico Borgo is in the oldest section of the town, the centro storico, at the top of which are the remains of a castle which predates the 12th century. The Borgo itself is a labyrinth of historic houses which have, over the centuries, been built into the hillside. Stone and marble stairs, frequently under old stone arches, connect the streets. Calitri suffered a devastating earthquake in 1980 and has only been partially rebuilt. The Castello at the top of its distinctive cone shaped hilltop is very impressive for its strong architectural forms. In recent reconstructions they are remerging as an important and physically attractive feature of the town.

People  
 Vinicio Capossela, singer-songwriter
 Angelo Maffucci, an Italian pathologist remembered for isolating the bacteria that causes avian tuberculosis

Sister cities 
  Lavena Ponte Tresa (Italy)

See also 
Irpinia

References

Sources
The role of the seismic trigger in the Calitri landslide (Italy): Historical Reconstruction and Dynamic Analysis Martino; Salvatore; Scarascia Mugnozza; Gabriele Publisher: Elsevier Ltd Publish date: 2005-12

External links 

 Calitri official website
 Extracted Civil Records of Calitri

Cities and towns in Campania